To help compare different orders of magnitude, the following list describes various speed levels between approximately 2.2 m/s and 3.0 m/s (the speed of light). Values in bold are exact.

List of orders of magnitude for speed

See also
Typical projectile speeds - also showing the corresponding kinetic energy per unit mass
Neutron temperature

References

Units of velocity
Physical quantities
Speed